Maronite Catholic Archeparchy of Cyprus (Latin: Archeparchy Cyprensis Maronitarum) is a seat of the Maronite Church immediately subject to the Holy See. It is currently ruled by Archeparch Joseph Soueif.

Territory and statistics

The archeparchy extends its jurisdiction over all the faithful Maronites of the island of Cyprus. Its arcieparchial seat is the city of Nicosia, where is located the Our Lady of Grace Cathedral (Nicosia).

The archeparchy at the end of 2013 out of a population of 838,897 people had 10,400 baptized, corresponding to 1.2% of the total. Its territory is divided into 12 parishes.

Parishes

 Parish of Our Lady of Grace in Nicosia
 Parish of Saint George in Kormakitis
 Parish of Saint Michael the Archangel in Αsomatos
 Parish of Saint Croix in Karpasha
 Parish of Saint Marina in Saint Marina
 Parish of Saint-Maron at Anthoupolis
 Parish of Saint-Marina of Kotsiatis
 Parish of Saint-Charbel in Limassol 
 Parish of Saint Marina in Polemidia
 Parish of Saint Joseph in Larnaca 
 Parish of Saint Kyriaki in Pafos

History

The Maronite community of Syria, Levant, and Lebanon arrived and settled in the northern part of Cyprus during the period between the 9th and 12th centuries, and went through all the vicissitudes of the Christian community of the island: the 1191–1473 French occupation under the House of Lusignan, rule under the Venetians from 1473 to 1571, and Ottoman feudalism from 1571 to 1878. The largest Maronite migrations were in the years 1224, 1570, 1596, 1776 and 1878.

A Cypriot Maronite community in communion with Rome is reported since 1316 when a Maronite bishop, Hananya, who during the reign of the Lusignan took office in Cyprus. The Catholic Bishops' series begins in 1357, when in the hands of the Latin bishop of Nicosia the Maronite community with his bishop emit a profession of the Catholic faith. This union is confirmed and reinforced by the Papal bull Benedictus sit Deus promulgated by Pope Eugene IV at the Council of Florence on August 7, 1455.

The Maronite community of Cyprus was the second largest community of Eastern Christians, after the Greeks. During the occupation of the island by officially Latin states, with the first Lusignan and then by the Venetians, the Maronites increased in number, thanks to the many properties and privileges granted to them by the new rulers of the island; they were present in sixty villages and, as estimated by Hackett, the number of faithful rose to around 180,000. In 1514, the Maronite Patriarch informed Pope Leo X about the machinations of and the seizure of Maronite churches by the Latin bishop of Nicosia.

The Ottoman occupation of Cyprus from 1571 to 1878 saw a continued decline of the Maronite community, with drastically fewer  faithful and of communities, as Maronites were driven out of their villages, the churches were destroyed, and the bishop was forced from his episcopal see.

With the death of Bishop Luc, a Cypriot, in 1673 there were not Maronite bishop of Cyprus till 1878. The bishops of Cyprus visited only sporadically the island, and the remaining Maronite faithful were cared by Franciscans (OFM). In 1735 were sent by the Superior general of the OML two monks to Cyprus, and they build a school for the Maronite community, which was inaugurated in 1763 by the synod of Maronite bishops, because the seat of the Bishop of Cyprus should initially remain in Lebanon.

The archeparchy was canonically erected in the Maronite Synod of Mount Lebanon in 1736. Since the end of the 16th century, the Maronite bishops, who until then had always resided in Nicosia, began to put their home on the mainland and returned only on the island starting from nineteenth century. In this period there were Latin priests to take care of the few island's Maronite community.

Following the failed 1974 Cypriot coup d'état, Turkey invaded Cyprus on 20 July, and over the next month occupied over a third of the island. Administered by a Turkish government, the occupied northern declared independence in 1983, establishing the Turkish Republic of Northern Cyprus.

Most of the Maronite community chose to leave their homes and move to the South. In the city of Kormakitis (50 km from Nicosia), the heart of the community, all the churches and Christian religious buildings have been converted into other structures, becoming warehouses, museums, or mosques. Today, it is the center of the Maronite Christian community, with about 130 people. Two villages have been turned into military bases. There is only one church in the north where Mass is regularly celebrated, dedicated to St. George.

In 2003, the North unilaterally eased border restrictions, allow Maronites to legally cross the border southward for the first time in 30 years.

From 4 to 6 June 2010, Pope Benedict XVI made an apostolic visit to the Christian community of Cyprus.  This was the first time a pope visited the island of Cyprus.

There are currently 11 communities that host a substantial Maronite presence: Nicosia (home of the archbishopric), Kormakitis, Asomatos, Ayia Marina, Karpasha, Anthoupolis, Kotsiatis, Limassol, Polemidia, Larnarca, Paphos.

Some of the Maronites of Cyprus still speak Cypriot Maronite Arabic, a dialect of Arabic.

Bishops

 Hananya (mentioned in 1316)
 Youhanna (mentioned in 1357)
 Jacob Al-Matrity (mentioned in 1385)
 Elias (before 1431 - after 1445)
 Youssef (died 1505)
 Gabriel ibn al-Qilai (1505–1516)
 Maroun (1516 -?)
 Antonios (mentioned in 1523)
 Girgis Hadthy (mentioned in 1528)
 Eliya Hadthy (mentioned in 1530)
 Francis (mentioned in 1531)
 Marcos El-Baytomini (mentioned in 1552)
 Girgiss (mentioned in 1562)
 Julios (mentioned in 1567)
 Youssef (died 1588)
 Youhanna (1588–1596)
 Moise Anaisi of Akura (1598–1614)
 Girgis Maroun al Hidnani (1614–1634)
 Elias to Hidnani (mentioned in 1652)
 Sarkis Al Jamri (1662–1668 deceased)
 Estephan El Douaihy (July 8, 1668 – May 1670 elected patriarch of Antioch)
 Luca of Carpasia (1671–1673)
 Boutros Doumit Makhlouf (1674–1681)
 Youssef (1682–1687)
 Gabriel Hawa, OLM (1723–1752)
 Tobias El Khazen (? - 28 March 1757 confirmed the patriarch of Antioch)
 Elias El Gemayel (died 1786)
 Philip Gemayel (1786 succeeded - 14 June 1795 elected patriarch of Antioch)
 Abdullah Blibl (Abdalla Blaibel) (12 March 1798 – 1 March 1842 deceased)
 Joseph Giagia (26 December 1843 – 1878 resigned)
 Youssef Al Zoghbi (1883 – December 17, 1890 [his death])
 Nemtallah Selwan (June 12, 1892 – September 18, 1905 [his death])
 Boutros Al Zoghbi (February 11, 1906 – October 28, 1910 [his death])
 Boulos Awwad (February 11, 1911 – June 14, 1941 resigned)
 François Ayoub (November 28, 1942 – April 16, 1954 appointed Archbishop of Aleppo)
 Elie Farah (16 April 1954 – 4 April 1986 retired)
 Joseph Mohsen Bechara (April 4, 1986 – June 11, 1988 appointed Archbishop of Antelias)
 Boutros Gemayel (11 June 1988 – 29 October 2008 withdrawn)
 Joseph Soueif (29 October 2008 – 1 November 2020)
 Selim Jean Sfeir (since 19 June 2021)

References

External links

 https://archive.org/stream/dictionnairedhis12baud#page/2/mode/2up, Raymond Janin, v. Chypre, in Dictionnaire d'histoire et de géographie ecclésiastiques, vol. XII, Parigi 1953, coll. 815-816
 http://www.maronitesofcyprus.com/upload/20080819/1219131385-15439.pdf, Guita G. Hourani, An Abridgment of the History of the Cypriot Maronite Community, Lebanon 2007
 http://www.persee.fr/web/ouvrages/home/prescript/article/mom_1274-6525_2000_act_31_1_1841, Gilles Grivaud, Les minorités orientales à Chypre (époques médiévale et moderne), in Chypre et la Méditerranée orientale. Formations identitaires: perspectives historiques et enjeux contemporains, Actes du colloque tenu à Lyon 1997, Lyon 2000, pp. 43–70 (i Maroniti, pp. 53–57)
 http://www.maronitearcheparchy.org.cy/upload/20100330/1269935746-21081.pdf, Guita G. Hourani: A Reading in the History of the Maronites of Cyprus From the Eighth Century to the Beginning of British Rule. (Die Autorin ist Chairwoman of the Maronite Research Institute; PDF; 510 kB)

 
Eastern Christianity in Cyprus
Maronite Catholic eparchies
Archeparchy
Catholic Church in Cyprus
Roman Catholic dioceses established in the 14th century
Catholicism in Cyprus